NT Gundam Cover is a cover album by Nami Tamaki, released on June 25, 2014 to commemorate the 35th anniversary of the Gundam franchise. The album peaked at #38 on Oricon's Weekly Album Chart on July 7, 2014 and charted for four weeks.

Track listing 
All tracks are arranged by Lefty Monster P, except 2, 9-10 by Toshiyuki Kishi, and 3 and 8 by Tom H@ck.

Charts

References

External links 
 (Nami Tamaki)
 (Teichiku Records)
 
NT Gundam Cover on VGMdb

2014 albums
Covers albums
Gundam
Nami Tamaki albums
Teichiku Records albums